Mizero Ncuti Gatwa (born 15 October 1992) is a Rwandan-Scottish actor. He began his career on stage at the Dundee Repertory Theatre. He was nominated for an Ian Charleson Award for his performance as Mercutio in a 2014 production of Romeo & Juliet at HOME. Gatwa had his breakout role as a gay teenager in the Netflix comedy-drama series Sex Education (2019–present), which earned him a BAFTA Scotland Award for Best Actor in Television and three BAFTA Television Award nominations for Best Male Comedy Performance.

Early life
Gatwa was born in Nyarugenge, Kigali, Rwanda, on 15 October 1992. His father, Tharcisse Gatwa, from Rwanda's Karongi District, is a journalist with a PhD in theology.

The family escaped from Rwanda during the Rwandan genocide against the Tutsi in 1994 and settled in Scotland. They lived in Edinburgh and Dunfermline. Gatwa attended Boroughmuir High School and Dunfermline High School before moving to Glasgow to study at the Royal Conservatoire of Scotland, graduating with a Bachelor of Arts in Acting in 2013. The Conservatoire awarded him an honorary Doctorate at the class of 2022 graduation ceremony.

Career
After graduating, Gatwa was granted a position in the Dundee Repertory Theatre acting graduation scheme where he performed in several productions including David Greig's Victoria. He had a brief role in the 2014 sitcom Bob Servant which was also set and filmed in Dundee. In 2014 Gatwa received a Commendation at the Ian Charleson Awards for his 2014 performance of Mercutio in Romeo and Juliet Home, Manchester.

In 2015, he appeared in a supporting role in the miniseries Stonemouth, an adaptation of the 2012 novel of the same name. That same year, he performed in the Kneehigh Theatres production of 946, which was adapted from Michael Morpurgo's The Amazing Story of Adolphus Tips about the rehearsals for the D-Day landing in Devon with numerous fatalities. Gatwa played Demetrius in the 2016 production of A Midsummer Night's Dream at Shakespeare's Globe directed by Emma Rice.

In May 2018, Gatwa was cast in the Netflix comedy-drama series Sex Education as Eric Effiong; the show was released in 2019 and garnered critical acclaim. Gatwa received praise for his portrayal of Eric from critics, particularly for how his character was not relegated to the cliché of "gay or black best friend slash sidekick stock character". He has earned numerous accolades for the role, including a BAFTA Scotland Award for Best Actor in Television in 2020, and three BAFTA Television Award nominations for Best Male Comedy Performance, one in 2020, 2021 and 2022 consecutively. In April 2022 Gatwa was cast in Greta Gerwig's Barbie.

Doctor Who
On 8 May 2022, it was announced that Gatwa had been cast in Doctor Who as a new incarnation of the show's protagonist, the Doctor, succeeding Jodie Whittaker in the role. Gatwa, who was cast in February, will be the first black actor to lead the series, as well as the fourth Scottish actor to do so. He was expected to take over the role in the third and final of the 2022 specials in October 2022. The final Thirteenth Doctor story The Power of the Doctor revealed that Gatwa would play the Fifteenth Doctor, with David Tennant (who had previously played the Tenth Doctor) returning to play the Fourteenth Doctor.

Filmography

Film

Television

Stage

Podcast

Video games

Awards and nominations

References

External links
 

Living people
1992 births
21st-century Scottish male actors
Alumni of the Royal Conservatoire of Scotland
Black British male actors
People associated with Fife
People educated at Boroughmuir High School
People educated at Dunfermline High School
People from Dunfermline
People from Kigali
Refugees in the United Kingdom
Rwandan emigrants to the United Kingdom
Rwandan male actors
Rwandan refugees
Scottish male film actors
Scottish male television actors
Scottish people of Rwandan descent